Santa Ana Airport  is an airport on Santa Ana, an island in the Makira-Ulawa Province in the Solomon Islands. The airport has scheduled flights provided by Solomon Airlines, using DHC-6 Twin Otter aircraft.

Airlines and destinations

References

Airports in the Solomon Islands